Sean Patrick Goble (born November 1, 1966), known as The Interstate Killer, is an American serial killer. A former truck driver, Goble kidnapped and murdered at least three women along highways in North Carolina and Tennessee during the winter of 1995. In addition authorities in ten other states investigated him for numerous other killings committed during the late 1980s and early 1990s. While he was cleared in some of those cases, as of today, his true victim count remains unknown.

Early life 
Sean Patrick Goble was born in Asheboro, North Carolina on November 1, 1966, the son of Kenneth and Erma Goble. At some point during his childhood, his family moved to Illinois. The first major event to happen in his life occurred at age 6, when his father raped a 10-year-old girl during a home invasion in Rockford. Young Sean was sitting in his dad's vehicle outside of the crime scene during the attack. Kenneth was charged with the crime and was sentenced to serve four to 20-years in prison. He was released after four years. As for Sean, he, his mother and sister continued to live in Rockford where he attended Auburn High School. In 1984, he dropped out during his senior year. Two years later, his father, who was now living in New Mexico, was charged with raping a 6-year-old there, for which he was sent back to prison, being released sometime in 1994. Sean Goble joined the army and later got married, fathering a son. His marriage later fell apart and Sean moved to North Carolina in 1988, and began working as a truck driver in 1991. At 225 pounds and 6-foot 3 inches, Goble described himself as a ladies man.

Murders

Brenda Kay Hagy 
Brenda Kay Hagy, 45, became Goble's first known victim. A native of Bloomington, Indiana, Hagy had a history of criminal charges in her native state for trespassing into truck stops, areas that are hotspots for prostitution. Hagy frequently moved across the east side of the country as a vagrant. She stayed at a homeless shelter in Gainesville, Florida on January 22, 1995. The next day she voyaged to Tennessee where, at a service station, she was abducted by Goble, who proceeded to rape and strangle her to death, breaking her neck in the process. He later drove his truck all the way to Bristol, Virginia, where he left her body along an access road to Interstate 81. He ran over her legs while in the process of driving away. The body was found later that day. An investigation was set up by police, who received numerous tips, the most promising being from a trucker who said he saw a semi parked along the same access road hours before Hagy's body was found.

Sherry Tew Mansur 
Sherry Tew Mansur, 34, had a history of arrests for prostitution from 1982 to 1994. She was last seen alive by friends and family on January 31, 1995 while visiting her sister in Bowie, Md. She later left the home with her 2 year old niece, who (her niece) was located the following morning in Washington, DC. ln Fredericksburg, VA Goble picked Ms Mansur up while driving his truck. According to Goble, the two had sex before he decided to strangle her to death. He later dumped her body along Interstate 40, where it was found on February 19. When it was found, her identity could not be conclusively proven, so for the next few months, she was only known as "Jane Doe".

Alice Rebecca Hanes 
Alice Rebecca Hanes, 36, was a native of Columbus, Ohio. She had been convicted of prostitution in the past. Her last location before her death was in Salina, Kansas, when she called from a truck stop along Interstate 70. From there, she hitchhiking to Tennessee, where Goble kidnapped her from a gas station and smothered her to death. He dumped her body along Interstate 81 in Virginia.

Arrest, convictions and status 
During the investigation, a plastic bag left behind at Hagy's murder contained the fingerprint of her killer. When submitted into a database, investigators got a hit when it matched to a print taken from Goble in September 1994 after an arrest for multiple misdemeanors. From there he was arrested in Winston-Salem, North Carolina outside the Rocky Road Express, the trucking company he was then working for. A search warrant was issued on his truck. In it police found a pocketbook that belonged to Hanes. They also seized travel bags, pornographic magazines, and women's panties. During an interrogation, Goble confessed to both murders, and admitted that he had killed a woman in North Carolina. Authorities figured out it was the Jane Doe and he was charged in her death. When the woman was identified as Mansur, he was charged in her murder. 

Along with Tennessee and North Carolina, Goble was also investigated in killings in Florida, Virginia, Ohio, Georgia, and Indiana, along with at least five others. For a brief period of time, Goble was investigated as a suspect for the serial killer known as Dr. No. He was later cleared of suspicion in those cases because, in some of the earlier killings, Goble was still in high school and later the army. 

Some murders that Goble became a suspect include multiple Jane Does found along highways between 1987 and 1995; the murder of Marcia Matthews in 1985; the murder of Shirly Dean Taylor in 1986; the murder of April Barnett in 1986; the murder of Anna Patterson in 1987; the murder of Kathryn Hill, aka Wendy Turner, in 1990; the murder of Cheryl Mason in 1991; the murder of Nona Cobb in 1992; and the murder of Margaret Goins in 1995. Goble was ruled out in Cobb's murder due to DNA testing, and in 2022 a different man was arrested for her death. Goble briefly stated that the murder of Hagy was unintentional, but that was disproved by investigators. Goble pleaded guilty to killing Hagy and Hanes in Tennessee, for which he was imposed two life sentences. He was later extradited to North Carolina and pled guilty to the murder of Mansur, receiving an additional 14 years to his two life sentences. Due to these convictions, Goble would be required to serve at least 103 years to be considered for parole. 

Later that same month, Goble was indicted with the unsolved 1994 murder of Lisa Susan O'Rourke, 29, whose body was found along Interstate 65 in Alabama. Goble was transferred to Baldwin County Correction Center to await trial for the murder. In April 1997, however, Alabama authorities decided to not prosecute him any further because of his current life sentences. Goble later took back his confessions, but nevertheless stayed behind bars. Goble is currently serving his sentence at Northeast Correctional Complex in Doe Valley, Tennessee.

Media 
Goble's killing spree is detailed in the episode The Interstate Prowler in the TV series Main Street Mysteries.

In 2003, Discovery Channel tv show The New Detectives examined the case in the episode titled "Blind Trust".

See also 
 List of serial killers in the United States

References 

1966 births
20th-century American criminals
American male criminals
American people convicted of murder
American prisoners sentenced to life imprisonment
American rapists
American serial killers
American truck drivers
Living people
Male serial killers
People convicted of murder by North Carolina
People convicted of murder by Tennessee
People from Asheboro, North Carolina
Prisoners sentenced to life imprisonment by Tennessee
Violence against women in the United States